Tēvita Tonga Mohenoa Puloka is a Tongan academic and religious leader. From 2018 to 2021 he served as Governor of Haʻapai.

Puloka served as a director of the Free Wesleyan Church of Tonga. In 2013 when eight ministers were caught misusing church funds he pushed for accountability and for ministers to be insulated from financial matters. In 2014 he opposed a strike by the Tongan Public Service Association as it would threaten the economy.

In November 2017 he was appointed to the Tonga Tradition Committee by Tupou VI. He later released a book in 2017 on his upbringing.

In June 2018 he was appointed Governor of Ha’apai. As Governor he was responsible for disaster management for Cyclone Tino. He was replaced as Governor by Viliami Hingano in January 2021.

References

External links
 

Living people
Governors of Haʻapai
Tongan academics
Tongan Christian clergy
Year of birth missing (living people)